{{DISPLAYTITLE:C13H12N2O3}}
The molecular formula C13H12N2O3 (molar mass: 244.25 g/mol, exact mass: 244.0848 u) may refer to:

 Alphenal, also known as 5-allyl-5-phenylbarbituric acid
 Haematopodin
 Indolyl-3-acryloylglycine